The following is a list of regional airlines organized by home country.

Africa

Americas

Asia

Europe

Oceania

Defunct regional airlines

Africa

Asia

Europe

Americas

Oceania

See also
 List of airlines
 List of low-cost airlines
 Flag carrier

References

Regional
Regional
Airlines Regional
List